Abhilasha is a 1968 Bollywood romantic film starring Meena Kumari, Sanjay Khan, Nanda, Rehman in lead roles. The film was directed by Amit Bose. The film's producer who was also a builder, built a bungalow in lieu of payment for Meena Kumari.

Plot 
A soon-to-be-married army officer faces rejection after he finds he was adopted as a child.

Cast
 Meena Kumari as Meena Singh
 Sanjay Khan as Lieutenant Arun Singh
 Nanda as Ritu
 Rehman as Major General Ranjeet Singh
 Kashinath Ghanekar as Dr. Ajay Singh
 Sulochana Latkar as Geeta 
 Murad as Rai Bahadur Daulatram
 Agha as Singing College Student
 Polson as Singing College Student
 Mohan Choti as Singing College Student

Music 
The music was composed by R. D. Burman and Majrooh Sultanpuri wrote the lyrics. The song "Wadiyan Mera Daman" is known for its fantastic composition and also finished in the top 25 chart of Binaca Geetmala of 1969.

References

External links 

1960s Hindi-language films
Indian romance films
1968 films
1960s romance films
Hindi-language romance films